The Book of Adventure Games is a book by Kim Schuette published in 1984 by Arrays, Inc.

Contents
The Book of Adventure Games is a strategy guide for 77 text adventure video games, and contains descriptions, reviews, maps, and solutions for each.

Reception
Allen Varney reviewed The Book of Adventure Games in Space Gamer No. 70. Varney commented that "The Book of Adventure Games is worth the money to any aficionado of 'interactive fiction'." Mike Nicita and Roun Petrusha of Popular Computing commented that "frustrated players will appreciate Schuette's treatment of 77 of the best-known adventure games for its help in learning to play and enjoy them." Similarly, Russ Lockwood of Creative Computing concluded "if you need help with a pre-1984 adventure game, The Book of Adventure Games just might be your salvation."

References

1984 books
Books about video games